EWD may refer to:

Gaming
 Extreme Warfare Deluxe, a text-based wrestling-themed computer game

Science and technology
 Edsger W. Dijkstra (1930–2002), Dutch systems and computer scientist
 EWDs, his manuscripts
 Electric window defogger, on vehicular rear windows
 Electrical wiring diagram
 Electrowetting display, a form of electronic paper

Rail transport
 Earlswood railway station (West Midlands), in England
 Eastwood railway station, in Sydney, Australia